The fourteenth edition of the Caribbean Series (Serie del Caribe) baseball tournament was played in 1971. It was held from February 6 through February 11 with the champions teams from Dominican Republic, Tigres del Licey; Mexico, Naranjeros de Hermosillo; Puerto Rico, Cangrejeros de Santurce, and Venezuela, Tiburones de La Guaira. The format consisted of 12 games, each team facing the other teams twice, and the games were played at Hiram Bithorn Stadium in San Juan, Puerto Rico, which boosted its capacity to 18,000 seats. The first pitch was thrown by Bowie Kuhn, by then the Commissioner of Major League Baseball.

Summary
Dominican Republic captured the competition with an undefeated record of 6-0, behind a strong effort by manager Manny Mota, who also led the Series hitters with a .579 batting average (11-for-19) and won Most Valuable Player honors. The pitching support came from Chris Zachary (2-0), Reggie Cleveland (1-0), and  reliever Pedro Borbón (1-0, two saves). Other key players for Licey included Jim Beauchamp, Carmen Fanzone, César Gerónimo, Elvio Jiménez and Rafael Robles.

Puerto Rico, Mexico and Venezuela shared second place with a 2-4 record.

Puerto Rico's team, managed by Frank Robinson,  was a huge favorite to win the Series, thanks to a roster loaded with prominent players like Sandy Alomar Sr., Don Baylor, Elrod Hendricks, Reggie Jackson, Mike Kekich, Buck Martinez, Jerry Morales, Tony Pérez, Juan Pizarro, but the team faded just after the first half.
 
For the first time, a representing team of Mexico took part in this tournament. Hermosillo was guided by Maury Wills and the offensive support came from Celerino Sánchez, who led the Series hitters in home runs (3) and RBI (9). Other noted players were Ed Acosta, Bobby Darwin, Héctor Espino, Francisco Estrada, Jim Ray, Sergio Robles, Vicente Romo and  Zoilo Versalles.

Graciano Ravelo managed the Venezuela club, which was clearly led by Pat Kelly (.381 BA, 2 HR, .714 slugging) and Ángel Bravo (7-for-21, .333 BA), while Leo Cárdenas hit .409 (9-for-22) for an otherwise weak offense, bottomed out by Ed Spiezio (3-for-19, .158 BA), José Cardenal (4-for-22, .182 BA) and Enzo Hernández (6-for-23, .264). George Lauzerique (1-0, 1.64 ERA, 7 SO) was a high point in a pitching rotation headed by Larry Gura (0-1, 4.00), Steve Barber (0-2, 5.56) and Aurelio Monteagudo (0-1, 9.58). Orlando Peña (1-0, 3.00 ERA) provided a solid support in three relief appearances.

Scoreboards

Game 1, February 6

Game 2, February 6

Game 3, February 7

Game 4, February 7

Game 5, February 8

Game 6, February 8

Game 7, February 9

Game 8, February 9

Game 9, February 10

Game 10, February 10

Game 11, February 11

Game 12, February 11

See also
Ballplayers who have played in the Series

Sources
Antero Núñez, José. Series del Caribe. Jefferson, Caracas, Venezuela: Impresos Urbina, C.A., 1987.
Gutiérrez, Daniel. Enciclopedia del Béisbol en Venezuela – 1895–2006 . Caracas, Venezuela: Impresión Arte, C.A., 2007.

External links
Official site
Latino Baseball
Series del Caribe, Las (Spanish)
 

Caribbean
Caribbean Series
International baseball competitions hosted by Puerto Rico
Sports in San Juan, Puerto Rico
1971 in Caribbean sport
1971 in Puerto Rican sports
Caribbean Series